Rhizotrogus mascarauxi is a species of beetle in the Melolonthinae subfamily that can be found in France and Spain.

References

Beetles described in 1895
mascarauxi
Beetles of Europe